Ebenezer Sekyere (born 12 December 1999) is a Ghanaian professional footballer who plays as a defender for Ghanaian Premier League side Accra Great Olympics.

Career

Early career 
Sekyere played for Ghana Division One League side Asokwa Deportivo SC before joining Teshie based-side Accra Great Olympics.

Great Olympics 
In April 2020, Asokwa Deportivo confirmed that two of their players, Sekyere and Charles Danso Otu had joined Accra Great Olympics after successful negotiation between the two parties. He signed a two-year contract with the club and was named in the club's squad list for the 2020–21 Ghana Premier League season. On 20 November 2020, he made his debut in a 3–0 win against Legon Clities, coming on in the 89th minute for Eric Osei Bonsu to make a cameo appearance.

On 17 December 2020, he played the full 90 minutes and helped keep a clean sheet in a 1–0 win over Kumasi Asante Kotoko with the only goal coming in from Michael Yeboah. The match was one of the major highlights within the season and drew a lot of media buzz within the season. On 30 January 2021 during the Ga Mashie Derby, he played the full 90 minutes and helped to keep a clean sheet in a historic 2–0 win over rivals Accra Hears of Oak, the first derby win for Olympics since 2004.

References

External links 

 

Living people
1999 births
Association football defenders
Ghanaian footballers
Accra Great Olympics F.C. players
Ghana Premier League players